Stephen Lawrence "Steve" Marten (born 8 October 1948, in Auckland) is a sailor from New Zealand. Marten represented his country at the 1972 Summer Olympics in Kiel. Marten took 21st place in the Soling with Con Linton and Jack Scholes as fellow crew members.

References

1948 births
Living people
New Zealand male sailors (sport)
Sailors at the 1972 Summer Olympics – Soling
Olympic sailors of New Zealand